HMS Phoenix was a Royal Navy  steel screw sloop. She was launched at Devonport in 1895, saw action in China during the Boxer Rebellion, and later served on the Pacific Station. She had the misfortune to be alongside a coaling pier in Hong Kong on 18 September 1906 when a typhoon struck the colony. She foundered and became a total loss.

Design
Phoenix was the name ship of her class of steel screw sloops mounting 10 guns. She and her sister ship, Algerine, were designed by Sir William White, the Admiralty Chief Constructor.

Construction
Phoenix was constructed of steel and given a protective deck of  steel armour over her machinery and boilers.  She was laid down at Devonport Dockyard on 25 July 1894 and launched on 25 April 1895.

Sail plan
As built the class was rigged with a barquentine sail plan (square rigged on the foremast, but fore-and-aft rigged on main and mizzen).

Propulsion
Phoenix was provided with a three-cylinder vertical triple-expansion steam engine developing  and driving twin screws.  The machinery was provided by Devonport Dockyard.

Armament
Her armament consisted primarily of six 4-inch quick-firing guns weighing a ton each and firing a  shell.  In addition she was fitted with four 3-pounder guns and three machine guns.

Royal Navy service
Phoenix was deployed to the China Station. She served in Chinese waters during the Boxer Rebellion under the command of Edward Hobart Seymour.

Fate
Phoenix was alongside a coaling pier at Hong Kong on 18 September 1906 when a typhoon struck.  She foundered and was declared a total loss. She was raised in 1907 and sold.

References

External links
 

 

Phoenix-class sloops
Victorian-era sloops of the United Kingdom
1895 ships
Ships built in Plymouth, Devon
Maritime incidents in 1906
Shipwrecks in the South China Sea